Thierno Barry may refer to:

People
Thierno Barry (footballer, born 2000), full name Thierno Issiaga Barry Arévalo, Guinean footballer playing as a winger
Thierno Barry (footballer, born 2002), French footballer playing as a forward